Kostyaki is a rural locality (a settlement) in Sibirsky Selsoviet, Pervomaysky District, Altai Krai, Russia. The population was 34 as of 2013. There is 1 street.

Geography 
Kostyaki is located 36 km north of Novoaltaysk (the district's administrative centre) by road. Lesnaya Polyana is the nearest rural locality.

References 

Rural localities in Pervomaysky District, Altai Krai